Miriam Galston (born 1946) is an American philosopher and associate professor at The George Washington University Law School. She is known for her research on Farabi
 and won the Farabi International Award for her book Politics and Excellence.

Books
 Politics and Excellence: The Political Philosophy of Alfarabi, Princeton University Press, 1990; translated into Persian, 2008

References

21st-century American philosophers
American political philosophers
American philosophy academics
Living people
1946 births
Farabi International Award recipients
University of Chicago alumni
George Washington University Law School faculty
Date of birth missing (living people)
Place of birth missing (living people)
Islamic philosophers
Farabi scholars